Independence Day Award, Bangladesh's highest civilian honours - Winners, 1980-1989:

1980

1981

1982

1983

In the year 1983, 4 individuals and 1 organization were awarded:

1984

In the year 1984, 6 individuals and 2 institutes were awarded.
One person was awarded.

1985

One person was awarded.

1986

Two individuals and one organization were awarded.

1987

Three individuals and one organization were awarded.

1988

Two individuals were awarded.

1989

Two individuals were awarded.

References

Civil awards and decorations of Bangladesh